Aikaterini Evangelinou (born 1988) is a beauty queen who represented Greece in Miss World 2007 in China.  She works as a model, and is taking a degree to become a dietitian.

References

1988 births
Greek female models
Miss World 2007 delegates
Living people
Greek beauty pageant winners